John Hamilton Evins (July 18, 1830 – October 20, 1884) was a U.S. Representative from South Carolina.

Born in Spartanburg District, South Carolina, Evins attended the common schools and was graduated from South Carolina College at Columbia in 1853.
He studied law.
He was admitted to the bar in 1856 and commenced practice in Spartanburg, South Carolina.
He entered the Confederate States Army as a lieutenant and served until the close of the Civil War, attaining the rank of captain.
He resumed the practice of law in Spartanburg.
He served as member of the State house of representatives from 1862 to 1864.
He served as delegate to the Democratic National Convention in 1876.

Evins was elected as a Democrat to the Forty-fifth and to the three succeeding Congresses and served from March 4, 1877, until his death in Spartanburg, South Carolina, October 20, 1884.
He served as chairman of the Committee on Territories (Forty-eighth Congress).
He was interred in Magnolia Street Cemetery.

See also
List of United States Congress members who died in office (1790–1899)

Sources

1830 births
1884 deaths
Confederate States Army officers
Democratic Party members of the South Carolina House of Representatives
Democratic Party members of the United States House of Representatives from South Carolina
19th-century American politicians
People from Spartanburg, South Carolina